Danford's lizard (Anatololacerta danfordi) is a species of lizard in the family Lacertidae. The species is native to Greece and Turkey. There are no subspecies that are recognized as being valid.

Etymology
The specific name, danfordi, is in honor of zoologist Charles G. Danford (1843–1928).

Habitat

Reproduction
A. danfordi is oviparous. An adult female may lay a clutch of 3–8 eggs.

References

Further reading
Arnold EN, Arribas O, Carranza S (2007). "Systematics of the Palaearctic and Oriental lizard tribe Lacertini (Squamata: Lacertidae: Lacertinae), with descriptions of eight new genera". Zootaxa 1430: 1–86. (Anatololacerta danfordi, new combination).
Günther A (1876). "Description of a new Species of Lizard from Asia Minor". Proceedings of the Zoological Society of London 1876: 818. (Zootoca danfordi, new species).
Sindaco R, Jeremčenko VK (2008). The Reptiles of the Western Palearctic. 1. Annotated Checklist and Distributional Atlas of the Turtles, Crocodiles, Amphisbaenians and Lizards of Europe, North Africa, Middle East and Central Asia. (Monographs of the Societas Herpetological Italica). Latina, Italy: Edizioni Belvedere. 580 pp. .
Sindaco R, Venchi A, Carpaneto GM, Bologna MA (2000). "The reptiles of Anatolia: a checklist and zoogeographical analysis". Biogeographia 21: 441–554. (Archaeolacerta danfordi, new combination).

Anatololacerta
Reptiles described in 1876
Taxa named by Albert Günther